There are at least 75 named trails in Carbon County, Montana according to the U.S. Geological Survey, Board of Geographic Names.  A trail is defined as: "Route for passage from one point to another; does not include roads or highways (jeep trail, path, ski trail)."

 Auto Bahn Ski Trail, el.  
 Barriers Ski Trail, el.  
 Bear Paw Ski Trail, el.  
 Bent Trail, el.  
 Berrys Ski Trail, el.  
 Big Bear Gulch Ski Trail, el.  
 Big Silver Ski Trail, el.  
 Bigfoot Ski Trail, el.  
 Black Powder Ski Trail, el.  
 Bobcat Ski Trail, el.  
 Boomerang Ski Trail, el.  
 Buckin Chute Ski Trail, el.  
 Burnt Ridge Trail, el.  
 Cariboo Ski Trail, el.  
 Chicken Ski Trail, el.  
 Coal Chute Ski Trail, el.  
 Columbine Ski Trail, el.  
 Custer National Forest Trail, el.  
 Drainage Ski Trail, el.  
 Drifter Ski Trail, el.  
 East Parks Ski Trail, el.  
 East Side Mine Ski Trail, el.  
 Easy Street Ski Trail, el.  
 Face of M Ski Trail, el.  
 First Street Ski Trail, el.  
 Flintlock Ski Trail, el.  
 Graham Trail, el.  
 Hancock Ski Trail, el.  
 Headwaters Ski Trail, el.  
 Hellroaring Ski Trail, el.  
 Intimidation Ski Trail, el.  
 Jones Park Ski Trail, el.  
 King Trail, el.  
 Latigo Ski Trail, el.  
 Lazy M Ski Trail, el.  
 Little Forest Ski Trail, el.  
 Little Silver Ski Trail, el.  
 Little Tree Ski Trail, el.  
 Lobo Ski Trail, el.  
 Lodge Pole Ski Trail, el.  
 Lodge Ski Trail, el.  
 Lower Barriers Ski Trail, el.  
 Lower Continental Ski Trail, el.  
 Lower Limited Ski Trail, el.  
 Lower Miami Beach Ski Trail, el.  
 Lower Royals Ski Trail, el.  
 Lynns Run Ski Trail, el.  
 Meeteetse Ski Trail, el.  
 Miami Beach Ski Trail, el.  
 Midway Express Access Ski Trail, el.  
 Miller Trail, el.  
 North Forty Ski Trail, el.  
 Paradise Ski Trail, el.  
 Penwells Ski Trail, el.  
 Pine Ridge Ski Trail, el.  
 Piney Creek Trail, el.  
 Second Street Ski Trail, el.  
 Show Off Alley Ski Trail, el.  
 Sidesaddle Ski Trail, el.  
 Silver Ski Trail, el.  
 Sluice Box Ski Trail, el.  
 Stockman Trail, el.  
 The Kitchen Ski Trail, el.  
 The Ridge Ski Trail, el.  
 Third Street Ski Trail, el.  
 Thompsons Ski Trail, el.  
 Tipi Ski Trail, el.  
 True Grit Ski Trail, el.  
 Turnpike Ski Trail, el.  
 Upper Continental Ski Trail, el.  
 Upper Limited Ski Trail, el.  
 West Parks Ski Trail, el.  
 West Side Mine Ski Trail, el.  
 Widow Maker Ski Trail, el.  
 Winchester Ski Trail, el.

Further reading

See also
 List of trails of Montana
 Trails of Yellowstone National Park

Notes

Geography of Carbon County, Montana
 Carbon County
Transportation in Carbon County, Montana